Al-Akhtal is a crater on Mercury.  Its name was adopted by the International Astronomical Union (IAU) in 1985. Al-Akhtal is named for the Arab poet Akhtal, who lived from 640 to 710 C.E.

References

Impact craters on Mercury